Protapanteles palabundus is an wasp belonging to the hymenopteran family Braconidae. The species was first described in 1986 by Tobias

References

Braconidae